Fenlon is a surname. Notable people with the surname include:

Adrian Fenlon (born 1972), Irish sportsperson
Edward Fenlon (1903–2010), member of the Michigan State House of Representatives and a circuit judge in Michigan
Gary Fenlon (born 1954), Australian politician
Iain Fenlon (born 1949), British musicologist who specializes in music from 1450 to 1650
Pat Fenlon (born 1969), Irish football player and manager
Pete Fenlon (born 1955), American role-playing game designer, game developer, graphics designer, and publisher